The 2013–14 IUPUI Jaguars men's basketball team represented Indiana University – Purdue University Indianapolis during the 2013–14 NCAA Division I men's basketball season. The Jaguars, led by third year head coach Todd Howard, played their home games at IUPUI Gymnasium (better known as The Jungle) and were members of The Summit League. They finished the season 6–26, 1–13 in The Summit League play to finish in last place. They lost in the first round of The Summit League tournament to IPFW.

On March 9, head coach Todd Howard was fired after a record of 26–70 in three seasons.

Roster

Schedule

|-
!colspan=9 style="background:#990000; color:#CFB53B;"| Exhibition

|-
!colspan=9 style="background:#990000; color:#CFB53B;"| Regular season

|-
!colspan=9 style="background:#990000; color:#CFB53B;"| 2014 The Summit League tournament

References

IUPUI Jaguars men's basketball seasons
IUPUI
IUPUI
IUPUI